Joe's Valley is a large concentration of sandstone boulders east of the Joe's Valley Reservoir near Orangeville, Utah. Joe's is a popular destination for bouldering, divided into three main areas: the Left Fork, the Right Fork, and New Joe's. Climbers have been coming to Joe's Valley since the mid-1990's,  and an estimated 15,000 climbers visit Joe's each year.

Joe's Valley Bouldering Fest takes place every fall, drawing competitive climbers from all over the world.

Famous problems
 Black Lung (V13) - Area 51
 Phony Baloney Traverse (V8) - Area 51
 Pocket Rocket (V5) - Area 51
 Smoking Joe (V9) - Big Joe 
 Scary Monster (V6) - Big Joe
 The Angler (V2) - Riverside

Sources
 A Bouldering Guide to Utah, Baldwin, Beck, and Russo.

References

External links 
 https://www.joesvalleyfest.com/

Climbing areas of Utah
Landforms of Emery County, Utah
Rock formations of Utah